Tullbergiidae is a family of springtails in the order Poduromorpha. There are more than 30 genera and 120 described species in Tullbergiidae.

Genera
These 34 genera belong to the family Tullbergiidae:

 Ameritulla
 Anaphorura de Izarra, 1972
 Boudinotia Weiner & Najt, 1991
 Clavaphorura Salmon, 1943
 Delamarephorura Weiner & Najt, 1999
 Dinaphorura Bagnall, 1935
 Doutnacia Rusek, 1974
 Fissuraphorura Rusek, 1991
 Jevania Rusek, 1978
 Karlstejnia Rusek, 1974
 Marcuzziella Rusek, 1975
 Mesaphorura Börner, 1901
 Metaphorura Stach, 1954
 Mexicaphorura
 Mixturatulla
 Multivesicula Rusek, 1982
 Najtiaphorura Weiner & Thibaud, 1991
 Neonaphorura Bagnall, 1935
 Neotullbergia Bagnall, 1935
 Paratullbergia Womersley, 1930
 Pongeiella Rusek, 1991
 Prabhergia Salmon, 1965
 Psammophorura Thibaud & Weiner, 1994
 Rotundiphorura Rusek, 1991
 Scaphaphorura Petersen, 1965
 Sensilatullbergia Thibaud & Ndiaye, 2006
 Stenaphorura Absolon, 1900
 Stenaphorurella Lucianez & Simon, 1992
 Tasphorura Greenslade & Rusek, 1996
 Tillieria Weiner & Najt, 1991
 Tullbergia Lubbock, 1876
 Tullbergiella
 Wankeliella Rusek, 1975
 Weinera Thibaud, 1993

References

Further reading

 

Poduromorpha
Arthropod families